Margarita Vitalievna Gritskova (born 9 December 1987) is a Russian mezzo-soprano in opera and lied singing. A member of the Vienna State Opera since 2012, she is focused on roles by Rossini such as Rosina in Il barbiere di Siviglia and La Cenerentola, but has also performed in Baroque opera and contemporary works such as Tri sestri by Péter Eötvös.

Life 
Born in Saint Petersburg, Gritskova studied piano and voice at the Saint Petersburg Conservatory with Irina Petrovna Bogacheva. The young artist won several international singing competitions. During her studies, she performed the title role in Bizet's Carmen at the Saint Petersburg Conservatory conducted by Mariss Jansons in 2008. Gritskova has performed on Tenerife, in St. Moritz and Budapest, among others. Since the 2010/11 season, she was a member of the ensemble of Deutsches Nationaltheater Weimar, where she appeared in roles such as Carmen, Ottone in Monteverdi's L'incoronazione di Poppea, Cherubino in Mozart's Le nozze di Figaro, Bramante in Handel's Alcina, Maddalena in Verdi's Rigoletto, Olga in Tchaikovsky's Eugen Onegin, and Flora in Verdi's La traviata.

With the 2012/13 season, the singer moved on to the Vienna State Opera where she performed especially in Mozart roles, as Dorabella in Così fan tutte, Sesto and Annio in La clemenza di Tito, Idamante in Idomeneo, and Cherubino. Rossini roles have included Rosina in Il barbiere di Siviglia, Angelina and Tisbe in La Cenerentola and Isabella in L'italiana in Algeri. She also appeared there as Smeton in Donizetti's Anna Bolena, Carmen, Feodor in Mussorgsky's Boris Godunov, Dryad in Ariadne auf Naxos by Richard Strauss, Krista in Janáček's Věc Makropulos, and Masha in Tri sestri by Péter Eötvös.

In 2015, she first appeared at the Salzburg Festival as Cherubino. She also performed at the Rossini Festivals in Bad Wildbad and Pesaro, and in 2017 appeared as Isolier in Rossini's Le comte Ory at the Operklosterneuburg festival. In 2018, she first performed at the Opernhaus Zürich as Charlotte in Massenet's Werther. 

She has also taken part in concerts and recitals, such as the farewell concert for José Carreras at Carnegie Hall in New York City in September 2017.

Awards 
 2001: First prize at the II Open Rachmaninoff Regional Festival
 2003: Grand Prix at the II Open Rubinstein Children's Competition
 2004: Prize at the international competition In the Sign of Talents for especially gifted children – awarded with the Academic Likhachev Star
 2006: Prize of the III. open Russian music competition for singing and piano duos
 2007: Prize of the III. open Russian music competition for opera singers
 2008: Prize For the Youngest Talent at the Luciano Pavarotti International Competition in Modena.
 2009: First prize and award for youngest talent at the IV International Competition in Colmenar Viejo
 2010: Finalist at the international singing festival "Operalia"

References

External links 
 
 
 Margarita Gritskova Operabase

Russian mezzo-sopranos
1987 births
Living people
Musicians from Saint Petersburg